The Tenharim are an indigenous people of Brazil, living in the state of Amazonas.

Name
Their self-denomination is Kagwahiva. They are also known as the Parintintín or Parintintin people.

Notes

External links
Parintintín artwork, National Museum of the American Indian

Indigenous peoples in Brazil
Indigenous peoples of the Amazon